The Road a Year Long is a 1958 film directed by Giuseppe De Santis. A Yugoslavian-Italian co-production, it was Yugoslavia's first ever submission for the Academy Award for Best Foreign Language Film and was nominated for the award at the 31st Academy Awards in April 1959. It won the Golden Globe Award for Best Foreign Language Film. For his performance Massimo Girotti was awarded best actor at the San Francisco International Film Festival.

Plot
Emil Kozma (Bert Sotlar), a peasant from an isolated mountain village, starts building a road to a nearby town. Over time, other villagers join the endeavor, believing the construction is state-sponsored. Ultimately, they discover Kozma started the works on his own initiative and without a permit, but it is already too late to stop the project...

Cast
 Silvana Pampanini as Giuseppina Pancrazi
 Eleonora Rossi Drago as Susanna
 Massimo Girotti as Chiacchiera (Naklapalo)
 Bert Sotlar as Guglielmo Cosma (Emil Kozma)
 Ivica Pajer as Lorenco
 Milivoje Živanović as Davide
 Gordana Miletić as Angela
 Nikša Stefanini as David
 Hermina Pipinić as Agneza
 Lia Rho-Barbieri as Roza
 Antun Vrdoljak as Bernard

See also
 List of submissions to the 31st Academy Awards for Best Foreign Language Film
 List of Yugoslav submissions for the Academy Award for Best Foreign Language Film

References

External links

1958 films
1958 drama films
Italian drama films
1950s Italian-language films
Films directed by Giuseppe De Santis
Jadran Film films
Italian black-and-white films
Yugoslav black-and-white films
Croatian black-and-white films
Yugoslav drama films
1950s Italian films